Tag til marked i Fjordby is a 1957 Danish comedy film directed by Poul Bang and starring Dirch Passer.

Plot 
The creepy villain Lasse Larsen has a fantastic power over one of his half-sister lineage, dancer Lillian. He has a dangerous hypnotic grip on her and forces her — under hypnosis — to commit burglary.

Cast
 Dirch Passer as 'Lange' Emil Andersen
 Ove Sprogøe as Knud Tofte
 Buster Larsen as Lasse Larsen
 Lily Broberg as Gunhild
 Sonja Jensen as Lillian
 Asbjørn Andersen as Varehusdirektør Hallgren
 Paul Hagen as F. I. Duus
 Caja Heimann as Louise Hansen
 Henry Nielsen as Hotelportier
 Vivi Svendsen as Kvindelig butikstyv
 Karl Gustav Ahlefeldt as Mandlig butikstyv
 Bent Vejlby as Roe-Karl
 Carl Johan Hviid as Overbetjent
 Jørgen Weel as Betjent
 Knud Schrøder as Betjent
 Benny Juhlin as Betjent
 Marianne Flor as Sekretær
 Miskow Makwarth as Postmester

References

External links

1957 films
1950s Danish-language films
1957 comedy films
Danish black-and-white films
Films directed by Poul Bang
Films scored by Sven Gyldmark
Danish comedy films